Khortum (also Romanized as Khorţūm and Khortoom; also known as Bālā Maḩalleh-ye Khorţūm, and Hortum) is a village in Jirdeh Rural District, in the Central District of Shaft County, Gilan Province, Iran. At the 2006 census, its population was 783, in 200 families.

References 

Populated places in Shaft County